Edaphology (from Greek , edaphos 'ground' + , -logia) is concerned with the influence of soils on living beings, particularly plants. 
It is one of two main divisions of soil science, the other being pedology. Edaphology includes the study of how soil influences humankind's use of land for plant growth as well as people's overall use of the land. General subfields within edaphology are agricultural soil science (known by the term agrology in some regions) and environmental soil science. (Pedology deals with pedogenesis, soil morphology, and soil classification.)

In Russia, edaphology is considered equivalent to pedology, but is recognized to have an applied sense consistent with agrophysics and agrochemistry outside Russia.

History 
Xenophon (431–355 BC), and Cato (234–149 BC), were early edaphologists. Xenophon noted the beneficial effect of turning a cover crop into the earth. Cato wrote De Agri Cultura ("On Farming") which recommended tillage, crop rotation and the use of legumes in the rotation to build soil nitrogen. He also devised the first soil capability classification for specific crops.

Jan Baptist van Helmont (1577–1644) performed a famous experiment, growing a willow tree in a pot of soil and supplying only rainwater for five years. The weight gained by the tree was greater than the weight loss of the soil. He concluded that the willow was made of water. Although only partly correct, his experiment reignited interest in edaphology.

Areas of study

Agricultural soil science 

Agricultural soil science is the application of soil chemistry, physics, and biology dealing with the production of crops. In terms of soil chemistry, it places particular emphasis on plant nutrients of importance to farming and horticulture, especially with regard to soil fertility and fertilizer components. 

Physical edaphology is strongly associated with crop irrigation and drainage. 

Soil husbandry is a strong tradition within agricultural soil science. Beyond preventing soil erosion and degradation in cropland, soil husbandry seeks to sustain the agricultural soil resource though the use of soil conditioners and cover crops.

Environmental soil science 

Environmental soil science studies our interaction with the pedosphere on beyond crop production. Fundamental and applied aspects of the field address vadose zone functions, septic drain field site assessment and function, land treatment of wastewater, stormwater, erosion control, soil contamination with metals and pesticides, remediation of contaminated soils, restoration of wetlands, soil degradation, and environmental nutrient management. It also studies soil in the context of land-use planning, global warming, and acid rain.

See also 
 Soil functions
 Soil zoology
 Sustainable agriculture

Notes

References 
 European Environment Information and Observation Network (EIONET) Url last accessed 2006-01-10
 SSSA Soil Science Glossary Url last accessed 2016-01-10

External links 
 

 
Soil science
Physical geography